The Sakhalin Husky (Japanese: 樺太犬, Russian:  Сахалинский хаски) is an extinct sled laika bred by the Nivkh people of Sakhalin Island and adjacent areas. The breed is also known as Karafuto Ken, Sakhalin Laika, or Gilyak Laika. While bred primarily as a sled dog, some Sakhalin Huskies were used for hunting bear. As of 2015, there were only seven known dogs of this breed on their native island of Sakhalin.

In 2011, there were only two surviving purebred members of the breed in Japan. The sole remaining breeder on Sakhalin, Sergey Lyubykh, located in the Nivkh village of Nekrasovka, died in 2012. Before his death, Lyubykh stated that there were no longer enough living specimens of the breed to provide the genetic diversity necessary for continued breeding.

Appearance 
The body of the Sakhalin Husky is elongated, with a thick double undercoat. The tail is held straight or slightly bent to the side.  Sakhalin huskies can have black, red, gray, and brindle coloring. The Sakhalin Husky evokes a sense of power due to its strong skeletal structure and well-developed muscles.

History

The name 'Karafuto Ken' comes from the combination of Karafuto (the Japanese name for Sakhalin) and Ken (a Japanese word for dog) and hence provides the breed's geographical origin. This breed is rarely used now; therefore, few breeders remain in Japan.

Explorers who went to Franz Josef Land, conquerors of northern Alaska, and South Pole explorers (including Robert Falcon Scott) used these dogs on expeditions. They were used by the Red Army during World War II as pack animals, but that affair was short-lived because it was found that they have a strong dietary preference for salmon.

Offshoots of the Sakhalin Husky are theorized to be the progenitors of longer-coated Akitas.

Antarctic expedition
This breed's claim to fame came from the ill-fated 1958 Japanese research expedition to Antarctica. An emergency evacuation resulted in the abandonment of 15 sled dogs. The researchers believed that a relief team would arrive within a few days and left the dogs chained up outside with a small supply of food. However, poor weather conditions prevented the relief team from reaching the outpost.

Incredibly, nearly one year later, a new expedition arrived and discovered that two of the dogs, Taro and Jiro, had survived and they became instant heroes.  Taro returned to Sapporo, Japan and lived at Hokkaido University until his death in 1970, after which he was stuffed and put on display at the university's museum. Jiro died in Antarctica in 1960 of natural causes and his remains are located at the National Science Museum of Japan in Ueno Park.

The breed spiked in popularity upon the release of a 1983 film about Taro and Jiro, Nankyoku Monogatari. A second film from 2006, Eight Below, provided a fictional version of the occurrence but did not reference the breed. Instead, the film featured only eight dogs: two Alaskan Malamutes named Buck and Shadow and six Siberian Huskies named Max, Old Jack, Maya, Dewey, Truman, and Shorty. In 2011, TBS presented the much-awaited drama, Nankyoku Tairiku, featuring Kimura Takuya. It tells the story of the 1957 Antarctica Expedition led by Japan and their Sakhalin Huskies.

The breed and the expedition are memorialized by three monuments: near Wakkanai, Hokkaido; under Tokyo Tower; and near Nagoya Port.  Sculptor Takeshi Ando designed the Tokyo statues and was also the creator of the replacement of the famous Hachikō statue in front of JR Shibuya Station. The Tokyo statues were later removed, likely to be placed at Tokyo's National Institute of Polar Research.

The Sakhalin Huskies of the 1957-1958 Japanese expedition
Few sources provide the names of the 15 Japanese sled dogs that were stranded, as well as the photos and descriptions of the Huskies. The names of the dogs, and their fates, are listed here:

 Riki: Seven-year-old male with light gray coat and white markings, leader of the team. (disappeared)
 Anko: Three-year-old male with brown coat and a white streak on the chest. (disappeared)
 Aka:  Six-year-old male with dark gray coat, had a tendency to pick fights with other team members. (deceased)
 Kuma from Monbetsu: Five-year-old male with black coat, white socks, and white chest, sometimes served as lead dog. (deceased)
 Kuma from Furen: Five-year-old male with black coat and a ripple of white on the chest. Father of Taro and Jiro. (disappeared)
 Pesu: Five-year-old male with brown coat, black mask, and black ears, almost resembling a Belgian Tervuren. (deceased)
 Goro: Four-year-old male with black coat and white stripe on the face, almost resembling a Collie. Served as wheel dog of the team. (deceased)
 Deri: Six-year-old male with gray coat and a black saddle. (disappeared)
 Pochi: Four-year-old male with light brown coat and a ravenous appetite. (deceased)
 Moku: Four-year-old male with black coat and white socks on the front feet. (deceased)
 Jakku: Four-year-old male with black-and-white coat, almost resembling a Collie. (disappeared)
 Kuro: Five-year-old male with black coat and white markings on the face, muzzle, chest, and legs. (deceased)
 Shiro: Three-year-old male with snow-white coat, sometimes served as lead dog. (disappeared)
 Taro: Three-year-old male with black coat. Son of Kuma from Furen and older brother of Jiro. (survived)
 Jiro: Three-year-old male with dark brown coat, a ripple of white on the chest, and white socks. Son of Kuma from Furen and younger brother of Taro. (survived)

References

Further reading

External links

Sakhalin Husky Dog Photos

Dog breeds originating in Russia
Sled dogs
Rare dog breeds
husky
Breeds originating from Indigenous people